The Bà Triệu Temple (Đền Bà Triệu) is a temple at thôn Phú Điền, xã Triệu Lộc, huyện Hậu Lộc, Thanh Hóa province, Vietnam dedicated to the semi-legendary national heroine Bà Triệu (248AD). The Bà Triệu Temple Festival takes place on April 3.

References

Temples in Vietnam
Buildings and structures in Thanh Hóa province